The Roman Catholic Diocese of Crateús is a diocese located in the city of Crateús in the Ecclesiastical province of Fortaleza in Brazil.

History
 September 28, 1963: Established as Diocese of Crateús from the Diocese of Iguatu and Diocese of Sobral

Leadership
 Bishops of Crateús (Roman rite)
 Bishop Antônio Batista Fragoso (1964.04.28 – 1998.02.18)
 Bishop Jacinto Furtado de Brito Sobrinho (1998.02.18 – 2012.02.22), appointed Archbishop of Teresina, Piaui
 Bishop Ailton Menegussi (2013.11.06 − present)

References
 GCatholic.org
 Catholic Hierarchy

Roman Catholic dioceses in Brazil
Christian organizations established in 1963
Crateús, Roman Catholic Diocese of
Roman Catholic dioceses and prelatures established in the 20th century